Antonie de Gee (8 January 1872 – 19 January 1940) was a Dutch sports shooter. He competed in two events at the 1908 Summer Olympics.

References

1872 births
1940 deaths
Dutch male sport shooters
Olympic shooters of the Netherlands
Shooters at the 1908 Summer Olympics
Sportspeople from Rotterdam